Raymond Steineder (November 13, 1894 – August 25, 1982) was a Major League Baseball pitcher.

External links

1894 births
1982 deaths
Baseball players from New Jersey
Major League Baseball pitchers
Pittsburgh Pirates players
Philadelphia Phillies players
People from Salem, New Jersey
Sportspeople from Salem County, New Jersey